Enrique Magdaleno Díaz (born 4 November 1955 in Madrid) is a Spanish former professional footballer who played as a forward.

Honours
Real Burgos
Segunda División: 1989–90

Individual
Pichichi Trophy: (Segunda División): 1980–81

External links

Real Mallorca biography 

1955 births
Living people
Spanish footballers
Footballers from Madrid
Association football forwards
La Liga players
Segunda División players
Segunda División B players
Tercera División players
Real Madrid Castilla footballers
Levante UD footballers
Burgos CF (1936) footballers
Sevilla FC players
RCD Mallorca players
Real Burgos CF footballers
RSD Alcalá players